College Park Elementary School can refer to elementary schools in the United States:

 College Park Elementary School in Costa Mesa, California - Newport-Mesa Unified School District
 College Park Elementary School in Irvine, California - Irvine Unified School District
 College Park Elementary School in Ocala, Florida - Marion County Public Schools
 College Park Elementary School in College Park, Georgia - Fulton County Schools
 College Park Elementary School in Indianapolis, Indiana - Metropolitan School District of Pike Township
 College Park Elementary School in College Park, Maryland - Prince George's County Public Schools
 College Park Elementary School in Wilmington, North Carolina
 College Park Elementary School in Ladson, South Carolina - Berkeley County School District
 College Park Elementary School in Deer Park, Texas - La Porte Independent School District
 College Park Elementary School in Virginia Beach, Virginia